The Bazhenov Formation or Bazhenov Shale is a geological stratum in the West Siberian basin. It was formed from sediment deposited in a deep-water sea in Tithonian–early Berriasian time. The sea covered more than one million square kilometers in the central basin area. Highly organic-rich siliceous shales were deposited during this time in anoxic conditions on the sea bottom. The sea was connected to the world's oceans and contains trace minerals derived from dissolved minerals and organic materials similar to sapropel sediments in the Black Sea.

In addition to being a prolific deep water marine source rock (the International Energy Agency has called it the world's largest oil source rock) the formation is believed to contain substantial reserves of unconventional liquid hydrocarbons in form of tight oil and solid hydrocarbons in form of kerogen.

The Russian government agency Rosnedra estimated in 2012 that the Bazhenov contained 180 to 360 billion barrels of recoverable reserves. Total hydrocarbon resources are estimated in 50 to 150 billion tonnes.

References 

Geologic formations of Russia
Geology of Siberia
Jurassic System of Asia
Lower Cretaceous Series of Asia
Cretaceous Russia
Jurassic Russia
Berriasian Stage
Tithonian Stage
Shale formations
Source rock formations
Oil fields of Russia